Crystal jelly or crystal jellyfish may refer to:
Aequorea victoria, a Northern European species
Aequorea vitrina, an American species